The following is a list of the orders and medals issued by the People's Republic of China since its founding. The Working Committee of Party and State Merit and Honour Commendation is responsible for coordinating the work of Party and state merit and honor commendation.

History 
In the early days of the founding of the People's Republic of China, Mao Zedong and other leaders believed that the national honor system was a relic of old society, and that the pursuit of medals would encourage the prevalence of individualism and selfishness in society, which was inconsistent with the political moral standards of "selflessness". Therefore, the national honor system of the People's Republic of China had not been fully established before 2016 and was in a blank state during the Cultural Revolution period. China, together with Switzerland, South Sudan, Eritrea, etc., is listed as one of the few countries in the world that have not set up a national honours system.

In recent years, calls were made for the government of China to improve the national honour system and make to award national medals. In 2007, the Ministry of Civil Affairs of the People's Republic of China announced the decision to establish a national honour system  in an effort to "unite the sons and daughters of China with common values." On December 27, 2015, the 18th session of the Standing Committee of the Twelfth National People's Congress passed the Law of the People's Republic of China on National Medals and Titles of Honour, which came into force on January 1, 2016. According to the provisions of this law, the state establishes the Order of the Republic, which is awarded to outstanding people who have made great contributions and made outstanding contributions to the construction of socialism with Chinese characteristics and the defense of the country. The Friendship Medal will be awarded to foreigners who have made outstanding contributions to China's socialist modernization drive, to promoting exchanges and cooperation with other countries, and to maintaining world peace. The National Honorary Title shall be established to award outstanding persons who have made significant contributions and enjoyed high reputation in various fields and industries such as economy, society, national defense, foreign affairs, education, science and technology, culture, public health, sports and so on. The Order of July the First is awarded to outstanding party members. These five highest orders of honour in China form the core of its newly established system for merit and honour. The first August 1 Medal and the Friendship Medal were conferred on 28 July 2017 and 8 June 2018 respectively, the Republic Medal and the National Medal of Honour on 29 September 2019, and the July 1 Medal on 29 June 2021.

Precedent 
National medals and titles of national honour are usually awarded once every five years on the fifth and tenth anniversaries of the founding of the Chinese Communist Party (CCP), the People's Republic of China and the People's Liberation Army, and may be awarded at other times if necessary. The Standing Committee of the National People's Congress is responsible for the proposal of nomination of prospective individuals for inclusion to the national honours list to be awarded for these occasions.

Civilian

Medals

Honorary titles and awards

People's Liberation Army

Order

Medal

Ribbons 

Qualification badges are a series of decorations of People's Liberation Army Type 07 in the form of small ribbons mounted on small metal bars indicating military rank, billet, or length of service. Only PLA/PAPF officers can wear qualification badges, PLA/PAPF soldiers wear National Defense Service Medal instead.

Billet and rank ribbons 
Each row has three ribbons; a blank white ribbon is used to fill out a row that only has two ribbons. Ranks and billets can be inferred from the number of rows. The rule is: 
 7 rows: Level of Vice Chairman of CMC and CMC members
 6 rows: Level of Theater Command
 5 rows: Level of Corps
 4 rows: Level of Division
 3 rows: Level of Regiment/Brigade
 2 rows: Level of Battalion
 1 row: Level of Company and Platoon

The ribbon at the middle of top row is called a rank ribbon and has at least one five-pointed star on it. One star represent for deputy posts (except level of vice chairman of CMC and CMC members and platoon), and two stars for principal posts. The color of stars also differs from ranks, over and include level of corps it is golden and below it is silver.

Length of service ribbons 
All ribbons except for the rank/billet ribbon centered at the top row are used to represent the wearer's length of service, similar to the U.S. military's service stripes.

Ribbon list

Swords 
Sword of Deep Blue – Awarded as a Naval honor
Sword of The Sea – Awarded to graduating cadets of Dalian Naval Academy
Sword of Military Spirit – Awarded to graduating cadets of PLA Nanjing Political College

See also 

 Service ribbon
 Order
 List of military decorations
 List of civil awards and decorations
 Ranks of the People's Liberation Army
 Socialist orders of merit

References

External links